Nevres Fejzić (born 4 November 1990) is a Bosnian professional footballer who plays as a goalkeeper for Bosnian Premier League club Tuzla City.

Club career

Early career
Fejzić started off his career as a youngster at local club Drina Zvornik, but signed his first professional contract with Radnik Hadžići in the summer of 2010. After one season at Radnik, he signed a contract with Bosnian Premier League club Travnik in July 2011, for who he played three years.

In the summer of 2014, Fejzić signed with newly promoted First League of FBiH team Metalleghe-BSI. He won the First League of FBiH with Metalleghe and got promoted to the Bosnian Premier League in the 2015–16 season. Fejzić left Metalleghe-BSI after the end of the 2016–17 Premier League season.

Krupa
On 22 June 2017, Fejzić signed a one year contract with Krupa. He made his official debut for Krupa on 12 August 2017, in a 1–0 away league loss against Zrinjski Mostar.

In May 2018, with Krupa, he finished as Bosnian Cup runner-up, after losing to Željezničar in the 2017–18 Bosnian cup final. Fejzić left the club on 30 May 2018, after his contract with Krupa expired.

Tuzla City
Only one week after leaving Krupa, on 7 June 2018, Fejzić signed a contract with newly promoted Bosnian Premier League side Tuzla City, at that time still known as Sloga Simin Han. He made his first appearance for Tuzla City on 22 July 2018, in a 1–0 away league loss against Široki Brijeg.

On 23 February 2019, in a league game against Sarajevo, Fejzić suffered a concussion after accidentally getting hit in the head by Sarajevo captain Krste Velkoski, after which he needed to stay at a hospital for 24 hours in order to get proper treatment. In a 2020–21 Bosnian Premier League game against Mladost Doboj Kakanj on 15 August 2020, he earned himself a straight red card after fouling an opposing player.

International career
Fejzić represented Bosnia and Herzegovina at under-21 level from 2011 to 2012.

Career statistics

Club

Personal life
Nevres's cousin Irfan Fejzić is also a professional footballer who plays as a goalkeeper.

Honours
Metalleghe-BSI
First League of FBiH: 2015–16

Krupa
Bosnian Cup runner-up: 2017–18

References

External links
Nevres Fejzić at Sofascore

1990 births
Living people
People from Zvornik
Association football goalkeepers
Bosnia and Herzegovina footballers
Bosnia and Herzegovina under-21 international footballers
FK Radnik Hadžići players
NK Travnik players
NK Metalleghe-BSI players
FK Krupa players
FK Tuzla City players
First League of the Federation of Bosnia and Herzegovina players
Premier League of Bosnia and Herzegovina players